Gandzasar is a 13th-century Armenian Apostolic cathedral (historically a monastery) near the village of Vank in the Martakert Province of the breakaway Republic of Artsakh, de jure in the Kalbajar District of Azerbaijan. It has historically been the region's most important church since its foundation. One of the finest pieces of Armenian architecture of the mid-1200s, the building is best known among scholars for its richly decorated dome.

In Azerbaijan, the monastery is called Ganjasar and the Azerbaijan authorities deny its Armenian heritage, instead referring to it as "Caucasian Albanian".

History

Background 
The name Gandzasar, which means "treasure mountain" in Armenian, is believed to have originated from the tradition that the monastery was built on a hill containing ores of silver and other metals.

The site was first mentioned in written records by the tenth century Catholicos Anania of Moks (r. 946-968), who listed Sargis, a monk from Gandzasar, among the participants of a 949 council convened in Khachen to reconcile Chalcedonian and non-Chalcedonian Armenians. Khachkars dated 1174, 1182, and 1202 have been found around the monastery, which also point to the existence of a church or monastery at the site.

Foundation 
The main church was built between 1216 and 1238 by Hasan-Jalal Dawla, the Armenian prince of Inner Khachen and the patriarch of the House of Hasan-Jalalyan. It was consecrated on July 22, 1240, on the Feast of the Transfiguration (Vardavar) in attendance of some 700 priests. The gavit (narthex), to the west of the church, was started in 1240 and completed in 1266 by Atabek, the son of Hasan-Jalal and his wife, Mamkan. Kirakos Gandzaketsi, a contemporary historian, described the construction of the church in his History of Armenia.

14th-16th centuries 
Gandzasar became the seat of the Catholicosate of (Caucasian) Albania, a see of the Armenian Apostolic Church, in the late 14th century. Rouben Paul Adalian considers the foundation of the see a result of an ancient bishopric seeking "ecclesiastical autonomy to compensate for the lack of control and communication from a central pontificate" and part of various local strategies in an Armenia dominated by foreign and Islamic rule to "preserve some semblance of religious authority among the people". In the 16th century it became subordinate to the Etchmiadzin catholicosate.

17th-early 20th centuries 
According to contemporary sources,  in early 1700s the patriarch of Gandzasar had authority over some 900 villages with hundreds of households in each, composed of peasant and merchant Armenians.

In the 17th and 18th centuries Gandzasar became the center in the liberation efforts by Karabakh Armenian meliks, who were united around Catholicos Yesayi Hasan-Jalalyan (d. 1728). He was staunchly pro-Russian and in a 1701 letter signed by Karabakh and Syunik meliks, he asked Peter the Great to protect Armenians from Muslims. However, it was not until the early 1800s that the Russian Empire took control of the region. The Karabakh Khanate eventually came under complete Russian control through the Treaty of Gulistan. Through the 1836 regulation by the Russian authorities, known as Polozhenie, Gandzasar ceased to be the seat of the diocese of Karabakh, which was moved to Shusha. It was gradually abandoned and became dilapidated by the late 19th century.

Soviet period 
Gandzasar was closed down by the Soviet authorities no later than 1930. The diocese of Artsakh was reestablished in 1989. Archbishop Pargev Martirosyan was named its primate. Due to his efforts, Gandzasar reopened on October 1, 1989 after six months of renovations. The Soviet government had given permission, while that of Soviet Azerbaijan had not. Gandzasar became the first church to be reopened after decades of suppression. According to Zori Balayan several KGB agents "could [have been] spotted among the crowd attending." Gandzasar served as seat of the bishop before it was moved to Ghazanchetsots Cathedral in Shusha (Shushi) in 1998.

First Nagorno-Karabakh War 
Gandzasar was attacked several times during the First Nagorno-Karabakh War. On July 6, 1991 Soviet soldiers and OMON (special police) officers raided Gandzasar allegedly in search of guns. They checked papers and conducted a thorough search, including in the graveyard.

Fierce fighting took place around Gandzasar in 1992, when Azerbaijan besieged the area. The Armenians broke the siege, which saved Gandzasar and enhanced its spiritual status, wrote Thomas de Waal. On August 16, 1992 some of the outlying buildings within the monastery complex were destroyed as a result of Azerbaijani bombardment by helicopters, which intentionally targeted the church. Corley writes that the attempted bombing of Gandzasar was not of any military importance and that its raid "appeared to be a deliberate attempt to attack the Armenian heritage in Karabakh."

On August 31, 1992 Armenia's Defense Minister Vazgen Sargsyan and Serzh Sargsyan, the head of the self-defense committee of Karabakh Armenians, convened the first meeting of the region's commanders in one of the monastic cells of Gandzasar.

On January 20, 1993 an air strike conducted by two Azerbaijani attack aircraft caused serious damage to the monastery, killed several people nearby and wounded a priest.

Restoration and revival 
Following the war, the monastery was completely refurbished through the funding of Russia-based businessman and philanthropist Levon Hayrapetyan, a native of Vank. Restoration works, which lasted from 2000 to 2002, included restoration of the altar, gavit, and tiling of the floor. Hayrapetyan also funded the asphalting of the road leading to the church. Some controversy surrounded the tiling of the wall around the monastery in 2011. It was funded by Hayrapetyan and carried out by a company owned by Vladimir Hayrapetyan, his younger brother. While Archbishop Pargev Martirosyan said the wall was not medieval and did not have much architectural significance, therefore tiling was justified, critics argued it was part of the historic complex.

On October 16, 2008 a mass wedding, sponsored by Levon Hayrapetyan took place in Karabakh. Some 700 couples got married on that day, 500 of whom married at Ghazanchetsots Cathedral in Shushi and 200 at Gandzasar. On April 13, 2016 Catholicos Karekin II and Catholicos of Cilicia Aram I delivered a prayer for peace and safety of Nagorno-Karabakh. It came days after the clashes between Armenian and Azerbaijani forces, which were the deadliest since the ceasefire of 1994. The monastery's 770th anniversary was commemorated in 2010 and the 777th anniversary in 2017.

Description 

The walled monastery complex includes the church with its narthex (gavit), living quarters, bishop's residence, refectory, and a school building. The living quarters, located on the northern side contain eight cells, were built in the 17th century. On the eastern side there is a refectory, built circa 1689. The two-floored school building was erected in 1898. To the south of the monastery walls is the old cemetery, where priests, bishops and notable laypeople (such as meliks) of the areas were buried.

Anatoli L. Yakobson called Gandzasar an "encyclopedia" of Armenian architecture, while Bagrat Ulubabyan and M. S. Asatryan described it as a "jewel".

The monastery consists of a narthex (gavit) and the main church, named for John the Baptist.

The narthex or gavit, measured , is a square-plan hall with two columns near the eastern wall that support the roof. It is very similar to the gavit of the Holy Cross church of Haghpat Monastery. The portal on western facade of the gavit is richly decorated.

The main church, named for John the Baptist, has a rectangular, cruciform plan with two-floored sacristies (chambers) on four corners. In its style, it is similar to the plans of the main churches of Geghard, Hovhannavank and Harichavank, also built in the 13th century.

The church is prominent for its richly decorated 16-sided cupola. The bas-reliefs on its exterior depict the Crucifixion of Jesus, Mary with baby Jesus, Adam and Eve, two ktetors (patrons) holding the model of the church, geometrical figures, such as rosettes, head of a bull and an eagle. The bas-reliefs have been compared to the elaborate carvings of Aghtamar.

The interior pendentives under the cylindrical dome in the interior are decorated with geometrical ornaments such as stars, circles and squares, plants such as spiral shoots, palmettes. Each side of the pendentive has high reliefs depicting head of a sheep, heads of a bull and anthropomorphic figures. According to Yakobson, sheep and bulls were considered holy animals in this period and are used as protectors of the structure.

Significance

Ancient cultural center 
Since its foundation the monastery was for centuries a center of education and manuscript production. It served as the burial place of Armenian princes of Khachen.

Matenadaran branch
A branch of the Matenadaran, the Yerevan-based museum and research institute of manuscripts, was established at the monastery in 2015. During the 2020 Nagorno-Karabakh war, the more than one hundred manuscripts kept there were evacuated to Yerevan and displayed at the Yerevan Matenadaran in March 2021.

Tourism and pilgrimage
Gandzasar is the principal historic tourist attraction in all of Karabakh (Artsakh) and one of the top destinations overall. It is also a center of pilgrimage as the region's main historic cathedral both for Karabakh Armenians and tourists (of Armenian ancestry). Thomas de Waal noted as early as 1997 that Gandzasar, the most famous church in Karabakh, "has acquired a mythical status in Karabakh." Felix Corley wrote that it is, along with Ghazanchetsots Cathedral in Shushi (Shusha), a powerful symbol of history and identity of Karabakh Armenians regardless their religiosity.

Azerbaijani negationism 

In the 1970s, Soviet Azerbaijani historians, particularly Rashid Geyushev and Ziya Bunyadov, asserted a negationist theory that postulated that Gandzasar was a Caucasian Albanian monument. They based their claim on the fact that it was the seat of the Albanian Catholicosate of the Armenian Apostolic Church. This theory was adopted and promoted by other Azerbaijani historians, such as Davud Akhundov, and since been adopted by Azerbaijan's authorities. For instance, in 2017, Hikmet Hajiyev, Spokesman for the Azerbaijani Foreign Ministry, stated that Gandzasar is an "Albanian Christian temple, occupied by the Armenian armed forces in the Kalbajar region, is not Gandzasar, but Ganjasar, and has nothing to do with the Armenian Gregorian Church."

A number of scholars have taken issue with the Azerbaijani state version of the region's local history, including Victor Schnirelmann, who notes that Caucasian Albania disappeared in the 10th century, and that the Armenian Church simply adopted the name for its easternmost diocese out of tradition. Schnirelmann notes that Azerbaijani historians intentionally omit the fact that Gandzasar is a typical example of Armenian architecture of 10th-13th centuries, as well as the numerous Armenian inscriptions on its walls. Thomas de Waal noted that in a 1997 pamphlet titled "The Albanian Monuments of Karabakh" by Igrar Aliyev and Kamil Mamedzade "carefully left out all the Armenian writing" in the depiction of the façade of Gandzasar on its cover. Rouben Galichian notes that Gandzasar, though presented in Azerbaijan as supposedly an "Albanian-Azerbaijani" historic monastery and a part of Azerbaijan's cultural heritage, was left to decay under Azerbaijani control.

Gallery

References 
notes

citations

Bibliography

Further reading 
  Yakobson, Anatoly L. "From the History of Medieval Armenian Architecture: the Monastery of Gandzasar," in: Studies in the History of Culture of the Peoples in the East. Moscow-Leningrad. 1960.
 Գանձասարի վանքի նորահայտ արձանագրությունը 
 Արցախի հոգևոր թեմի պատմությունը վավերագրերում (1813-1933)

External links 

 Gandzasar.com - Gandzasar Monastery (official site)
 Program about Gandzasar Monastery by Vem Radio

Religious buildings and structures completed in 1238
Christian monasteries established in the 13th century
Christian monasteries in the Republic of Artsakh
Oriental Orthodox congregations established in the 13th century
Christian monasteries in Azerbaijan
Churches in Azerbaijan
Armenian Apostolic monasteries
Armenian Apostolic monasteries in Azerbaijan